The Tour of Taihu Lake is a multi-day road cycling race held in China annually in November. It has been held since 2010, but the first edition was a one-day race. The 2010 and 2011 editions were rated 1.2 and 2.2, and was upgraded to 2.1 in 2013.

Jakub Mareczko holds the record for most stage wins, with 18, as of the end of the 2018 edition of the race.

Winners

References

External links
Official website

Cycle races in China
UCI Asia Tour races
Recurring sporting events established in 2010
2010 establishments in China
Autumn events in China